Grevillea neodissecta is a species of flowering plant in the family Proteaceae and is endemic to Western Australia. It is low, dense shrub with deeply divided leaves, the end lobes linear and sharply pointed, and small clusters of rose pink and white to cream-coloured flowers with a pinkish-red style.

Description

Taxonomy
This grevillea was first formally described in 1986 by Donald McGillivray who gave it the name Grevillea pilosa subsp. dissecta in his book New names in Grevillea (Proteaceae).<ref name=APNI1>{{cite web|title=Grevillea pilosa subsp. dissecta|url= https://id.biodiversity.org.au/instance/apni/543019|publisher=APNI|access-date=25 July 2022}}</ref> In 1993 Peter Olde and Neil Marriott raised the subspecies to species status as Grevillea dissecta, but the name was illegitimate because it had already been used for a fossil species. In 2014, Ian Mark Turner changed the name to Grevillea neodissecta in Annales Botanici Fennici. The specific epithet (dissecta) means "deeply-divided" and neodissecta refers to this being the new name for G. dissecta.
 
Distribution and habitatGrevillea neodissecta'' occurs in the Coolgardie bioregion of Southwest Australia, where it grows in mallee shrubland and heath on sandy and clay loam soils.

References

neodissecta
Proteales of Australia
Endemic flora of Australia
Flora of Western Australia
Plants described in 1986
Taxa named by Donald McGillivray